Tsintsadze is a Georgian surname. Notable people with the surname include:

 Besa Tsintsadze (born 1969), Georgian figure skater
 Dito Tsintsadze (born 1957), Georgian film director and screenwriter
 Giorgi Tsintsadze (born 1986), Georgian basketball player
 Irakli Tsintsadze (born 1964), Georgian composer
 Ivanna Klympush-Tsintsadze (born 1972), Ukrainian politician and journalist
 Kalistrate Tsintsadze (Callistratus of Georgia; 1866–1952), Catholicos-Patriarch of All Georgia
 Kote Tsintsadze (1887–1930), Georgian communist politician
 Sulkhan Tsintsadze (1925–1991), Georgian composer

Georgian-language surnames